Poets of Punjabi language (Shahmukhi: , Gurmukhi: ਪੰਜਾਬ ਦੇ ਕਵੀ).

Poets

 Baba Farid - (1173–1266)
 Damodar - 15th century
 Guru Nanak Dev ji - (1469 - 1539)
 Guru Angad - 16th century
 Guru Amar Das - 15th - 16th century
 Bhai Gurdas (1551–1636)
 Guru Ram Das - 16th century
 Shah Hussain - 16th century
 Guru Arjun Dev - 16th - 17th cen
 Bhai Gurdas - 16th - 17th century
 Sultan Bahu (1628–1691)
 Bhai Nand Lal (1633–1713)
 Bhai Mani Singh (1366–1737)
 Bulleh Shah (1680–1757)
 Guru Tegh Bahadur - 17th century
 Guru Gobind Singh - 17th century
 Waris Shah - (1722–1798)
 Ali Haider Multani - 17th-18th century
 Ratan Singh Bhangu (died 1846)
 Lutaf Ali Bahawalpuri - 18th century
 Khwaja Ghulam Farid- 18th-19th century
 Babu Rajab Ali- 19th century 
 Mian Muhammad Bakhsh - 19th century
 Maulvi Ghulam Rasool Alampuri - 19th century
 Qadaryar - 19th century
 Piloo - 19th century
 Piro Preman - 19th century
 Shah Mohammad - (1780–1862)
 Ali Arshad Mir - 20th century
 Puran Singh - 20th century
 Mohan Singh - 20th century
 Hashim - (1735–1843)
 Wasif Ali Wasif - 20th century
 Shareef Kunjahi - 20th century
 Mir Tanha Yousafi - 20th century
 Anwar Masood - 20th century
 Afzal Ahsan Randhawa - 20th century
 Aatish - 20th century
 Shaista Nuzhat - 20th century
 Bhai Veer Singh - 20th century
 Amrita Pritam - 20th century
 Dhani Ram Chatrik - 20th century
 Giani Dhanwant Singh Sital - (1912-1980) 20th century
 Faiz Ahmad Faiz - 20th century
 Darshan Singh Awara - 20th century
 Dr. Harbhajan Singh - 20th century
 Gurdas Ram Alam - 20th century
 Shiv Kumar Batalvi - 20th century
 Sharif Kunjahi - 20th century
 Bawa Balwant - 20th century
 Manjit Tiwana -20th century
 Navtej Bharati - 20th century
 Paash - 20th century
 Surjit Patar - 20th Century
 Amarjit Chandan - 20th century
 Ajmer Rode - 20th century
 Anwar Masood - 20th century
 Sukhbir - 20th century
 Jaswant Singh Neki - 20th century
 Shardha Ram Phillauri
 Ustad Daman - 20th century
 Jeet Aulakh - 20th century
 Munir Niazi - 20th century
 Sant Ram Udasi - 20th century
 Lal Singh Dil - 20th century
 Ahmad Rahi - 20th century 
 Mazhar Tirmazi - 20th century
 Harbans Bhalla (1930-1993) - 20th century
 Jaswant Singh Rahi - 20th century
 Sukhdarshan Dhaliwal - 20th century
 Chaman Lal Chaman - 20th century
 Sukhvinder Amrit - 21st century
 Satinder Sartaj - 21st Century
 Aizaz Ahmad Azar - 21st Century
 Munawar Shakeel - 21st Century
 Harmanjeet Singh - 21st Century

Further reading
Sufi Poets of the Punjab Pakistan (Their Thought and Contribution) Prof M Ashraf Chaudhary. National Book Foundation Islamabad. 
 "Great Sufi Poets of The Punjab" by R. M. Chopra, (1999), Iran Society, Calcutta.

External links 
 Punjabi Poetry
 Collection of Rare Work of Punjabi Poets/Writers
 Academy of the Punjab In North America (APNA)
 Punjabi Poets Poetry[ punjabizone.net website]
 Punjabi Poetry Legends and Poems

Lists of poets by language
Poets
Poets
!
Poets
Poets
Punjabi language-related lists